Velcha Cove (‘Zaliv Velcha’ \'za-liv 'vel-cha\) is the 400 m wide cove indenting for 680 m the east coast of Astrolabe Island in Bransfield Strait, Antarctica. It is surmounted by Drumohar Peak on the northwest and Rogach Peak on the south.

The feature is “named after Velcha Peak in Eastern Balkan Mountains.”

Location
German-British mapping in 1996.

Maps
 Trinity Peninsula. Scale 1:250000 topographic map No. 5697. Institut für Angewandte Geodäsie and British Antarctic Survey, 1996.
 Antarctic Digital Database (ADD). Scale 1:250000 topographic map of Antarctica. Scientific Committee on Antarctic Research (SCAR). Since 1993, regularly upgraded and updated.

Notes

References
 Velcha Cove. SCAR Composite Gazetteer of Antarctica.
 Bulgarian Antarctic Gazetteer. Antarctic Place-names Commission. (details in Bulgarian, basic data in English)

External links
 Velcha Cove. Copernix satellite image

Landforms of Trinity Peninsula
Astrolabe Island
Bulgaria and the Antarctic